Blauw Geel '38 is a football club from Veghel, Netherlands. Blauw Geel '38 plays in the Derde Divisie, the fourth tier of football in the Netherlands.

References

External links
 Official website
 Official Twitter

Blauw Geel '38
Football clubs in the Netherlands
1938 establishments in the Netherlands
Association football clubs established in 1938
Football clubs in North Brabant
Sport in Meierijstad